Babesia divergens is an intraerythrocytic parasite, transmitted by the tick Ixodes ricinus. It is the main agent of bovine babesiosis, or "redwater fever", in Europe. Young cattle are less susceptible. The current emphasis in Europe on sustainable agriculture and extensification is likely to lead to an increase in vector tick populations with increased risk of infection. B. divergens is also prevalent (infection rates of 11-23%) in cottontail rabbits on Nantucket Island, MA, USA.

Human infections are rare.  The most severe, life-threatening infections were described in asplenic patients. Infections in immunocompetent patients were also observed, and described as a "serious influenza-like" syndrome that requires medical treatment.

References

Further reading 

divergens
Parasites of mammals
Bovine diseases
Veterinary protozoology